This list contains an overview of Mecklenburg locomotives built from 1848 to 1922, and is based on the classification scheme of the Grand Duchy of Mecklenburg Friedrich-Franz Railway (Großherzoglich Mecklenburg Friedrich-Franz-Eisenbahn).

Context

Mecklenburg is a region in northern Germany comprising the western and larger part of the present day state of Mecklenburg-Vorpommern. Its largest cities are Rostock, Schwerin, and Neubrandenburg. In 1815, the two Mecklenburg duchies – Mecklenburg-Schwerin and Mecklenburg-Strelitz – were raised to Grand Duchies, and subsequently existed separately in Germany until the end of World War I. The earlier private railways were nationalised by 1890 into the Grand Duchy of Mecklenburg Friedrich-Franz Railway.

Overview of the locomotives 

Mecklenburg locomotives were given a name as well as a number at the outset, the names being mainly chosen from geographical features in Mecklenburg. This naming of locomotives ceased in 1895.

Originally, locomotive numbers followed the sequence in which they were produced. In 1890, on nationalisation, however, a new numbering scheme was introduced. Each class was allocated a specific range of numbers. The Grand Duchy of Mecklenburg Friedrich-Franz Railway divided the locomotives into the following different classes:

 I  – VII:     Passenger train locomotives
 VIII – X:   Goods train locomotives
 XI – XVIII: Tank locomotives
 XIX:        Narrow gauge locomotives
 XX:         Goods train locomotives
 XXI:        Tender locomotives

In 1910 a new scheme was introduced that broadly conformed to the Prussian system. This entailed allocating group letters as follows: the letter P to passenger train locomotives (Personenzuglokomotiven), G to goods train locomotives (Güterzuglokomotiven) and T to tank locomotives (Tenderlokomotiven). Individual classes were distinguished by an Arabic numeral after the letter. To specify the sub-class, superscripts were used. So, for example, locomotives with simple steam expansion were to  be given a "1" and compound locomotives a "2".

Steam locomotives

Early locomotives for mixed traffic 

These locomotives were all built for the  Mecklenburg Railway Company and went into the fleet of the Grand Duchy of Mecklenburg Friedrich-Franz Railway on nationalisation.

Passenger train locomotives

Goods train locomotives

Tank locomotives

Narrow gauge locomotives 

Locomotives of predecessors

See also 
Länderbahnen
Mecklenburg
Grand Duchy of Mecklenburg Friedrich-Franz Railway
UIC classification

References 

 
 
 
 
 

Defunct railway companies of Germany
Locomotives of Germany
Deutsche Reichsbahn-Gesellschaft locomotives
 
Locomotives
Railway locomotive-related lists
Locomotives
German railway-related lists